Tyuklya (also, Tuklya) is a village in the Masally Rayon of Azerbaijan.

References 

Populated places in Masally District